is the fifth single by Japanese idol group STU48, released on September 2, 2020. Yumiko Takino and Momoka Rissen served as lead performers for the title song. The title song is the first one to feature the second generation trainees, who debuted in December 2019. It topped the Japanese music charts in its release week.

Production and release 

The title song was released with two different lineups for all 21 full members, led by Yumiko Takino, and 23 trainees, led by Momoka Rissen. It is the first one in the AKB48 Group to have the music video produced in two versions, filmed at the Mitarai preservation district in Kure, Hiroshima and representing the "past" and "present", in which the second generation trainees and the full members portrayed the high school and adult versions of the same group of people. The two music videos were included on the Limited Edition releases, while a combined version was published on YouTube on July 23. 

The B-side  was performed by Fū Yabushita and Chiho Ishida (FūChiho), who also produced and edited the music video.  is the first appearance on a single by the group's rock band subunit, Aoi Himawari, while  was performed by the quartet of Takino, Kōko Tanaka, Yabushita, and Mai Nakamura.

The single was released in three editions and two Limited Editions. The Limited Editions included digital ballots to vote for the inclusion of members into a new subunit called the Setouchi PR Unit, which results were announced on October 18.

Reception 
"Omoidaseru Koi wo Shiyō" sold 159,000 copies in its release week according to Billboard Japan, and placed first on both the Oricon Singles and Billboard Japan Hot 100 weekly charts.

Note

References

External links 

  

2020 singles
2020 songs
Songs with lyrics by Yasushi Akimoto
King Records (Japan) singles
Oricon Weekly number-one singles
Billboard Japan Hot 100 number-one singles